Ruslana Sergeyevna Korshunova (2 July 1987 – 28 June 2008) was a Russian-Kazakhstani model. She established herself as a rising figure in the fashion industry by posing for magazines including Vogue and designers such as Vera Wang and Nina Ricci. 
Korshunova's unexpected death, under unexplained circumstances, became a longtime controversial subject of international attention.

Early life and career
Ruslana Korshunova was born in Almaty, Kazakh SSR. Her father, Sergey Korshunov, died in 1992 when she was 5 years old. Her mother Valentina (née Kutenkova) and her elder brother Ruslan live in Kazakhstan. With different degrees of fluency she spoke Russian, Kazakh, English and German.

She was discovered in 2003, when All Asia magazine printed a story on Almaty's local German language club, which Korshunova was then attending. Her photograph, which was featured in the article, caught the attention of Debbie Jones of Models 1; Jones tracked down and signed up the then 15-year-old Korshunova, who was nicknamed the Russian Rapunzel for her knee–length chestnut hair in her early work. Korshunova was represented by IMG (New York, Paris, London and Milan), Beatrice (Milan), Traffic Models (Barcelona), Marilyn Model Agency and iCasting Moscow, which was her mother agency. British Vogue hailed Korshunova as "a face to be excited about" in 2005. Korshunova modeled for the covers of French Elle and the Russian version of Vogue. She also modeled in print-ads for Nina Ricci, Blugirl by Blumarine, Clarins, Ghost, Girbaud, Kenzo Accessories, Marithé & François, Max Studio, Moschino, Old England, Pantene Always Smooth, Paul Smith and Vera Wang lingerie.

Death
On 28 June 2008, at around 2:30 p.m., Korshunova died after falling from the ninth-floor balcony of her apartment at 130 Water Street in the Financial District of Manhattan, USA. Police stated there were no signs of a struggle in her apartment and concluded that Korshunova's death was an apparent suicide. One of Korshunova's friends stated that she had just returned from a modeling job in Paris, noting that she seemed to be "on top of the world" with no apparent reason why she would commit suicide. Korshunova planned to celebrate her 21st birthday on Wednesday in Pennsylvania. Korshunova's former boyfriend, Artem Perchenok, stated that he dropped Korshunova off at her apartment several hours before her death after they watched the Patrick Swayze and Demi Moore film Ghost together. "I feel that she came to say goodbye", said Perchenok. "She was a good person", he added to The New York Post. However, Korshunova appeared brokenhearted and angry in some of her postings on a social networking site. Korshunova's most telling message came in March 2008: "I'm so lost. Will I ever find myself?".

Experts did not find any traces of someone else's skin underneath her nails. Korshunova's mother, Valentina Kutenkova does not believe in her daughter's suicide. "She told me about her work problems about a year ago. She said that she wanted to quit the modeling business. Everything was fine with her recently though. If she had problems at work, she would have told me", she said.

Muhammad Naqib, a concierge who worked in Korshunova's building stated, "I was shocked when I saw her on the pavement. She was on the road, small and pitiful, in a puddle of blood, surrounded by a crowd. Her arms and neck were broken", the man said. Naqib was immediately suspicious. "Only next day I realized what was wrong. It was her hair! It was much shorter than when I last saw her that night, lively and happy. It seemed like it was cut in a hurry since the ends were uneven." Moscow mortician Sergey, who worked on her makeup in a Moscow morgue, stated "All I got is a polite 'thank you'. But nobody called me for an interview ... [t]he hair could fall out because of a strong impact, but it could not become shorter. When I was preparing the body for a funeral, I noticed that the hair was in a very poor condition. I even offered to find her a wig, but her relatives refused. The ends were uneven, as if someone had cut it with scissors." According to the testimony of many witnesses, no strangers or suspicious people were noticed on the day of Korshunova's death in her building on Water Street. The back exit in the yard is visible to the concierge, and nobody could pass by the reception unnoticed. During her last visit, Korshunova's mother stopped at the apartment. According to Korshunova's friends, Valentina spent several hours at the door of the apartment. She is still hoping to find the answer from the local police. On July 7, 2008, Korshunova was buried at Khovanskoye Cemetery in Moscow. Her mother stated to Russian newspaper Komsomolskaya Pravda that the Russian capital was one of her daughter's favorite cities, and that "[She] would want her beloved Moscow to be her last resting place."

British TV producer and filmmaker Peter Pomerantsev has theorised that Korshunova's suicide was related to her involvement with Rose of the World, a controversial Moscow-based organisation which describes itself as "training for personality development". While researching for a documentary into Korshunova's death, Pomerantsev learned that the model spent three months attending training sessions at Rose of the World. These sessions—which encourage participants to share their worst experiences and recall repressed memories—are modelled after Lifespring, whose controversial methods were the subject of multiple lawsuits for mental damages in the US during the 1980s. Korshunova attended training sessions with a friend, Ukrainian model Anastasia Drozdova, who committed suicide under similar circumstances in 2009. Friends of the two women reported changes in behaviour after several months at the Rose. Korshunova became aggressive, while Drozdova experienced violent mood swings and grew reclusive; both lost weight. After three months of training, Korshunova returned to New York to look for work, where she wrote of feeling lost and doubting herself. Rick Ross, head of the Cult Education Forum, argues that organisations such as Rose of the World "work like drugs: giving you peak experiences, their adherents always coming back for more. The serious problems start when people leave. The trainings have become their lives—they come back to emptiness. The sensitive ones break." Only months after leaving the Rose, Korshunova was found dead.

References

External links

 
 Ruslana Korshunova's death Killed under unexplained circumstances
 
 USA Top Model 2008

Kazakhstani female models
Female models from Moscow
People from Almaty
Kazakhstani people of Russian descent
1987 births
2008 suicides
Female suicides
Suicides by jumping in New York City